Bendel is a surname. Notable people with the surname include:

Franz Bendel (1833–1874), Bohemian-German pianist and composer
Graham Bendel, writer and filmmaker
Hans Bendel (1814–1853), Swiss painter
Henri Bendel, American upscale women's specialty store based in New York City
Henri Willis Bendel (1868–1936), American businessman, fashion designer, and philanthropist

German-language surnames

de:Bendel